The 1998 Japanese Grand Prix (formally the XXIV Fuji Television Japanese Grand Prix) was a Formula One motor race held at Suzuka, Mie, Japan on 1 November 1998. It was the sixteenth and final round of the 1998 FIA Formula One World Championship. The 51-lap race was won by Mika Häkkinen driving for the McLaren-Mercedes team. Eddie Irvine, driving for Ferrari, finished second with David Coulthard third in the other McLaren. Häkkinen's win confirmed him as 1998 Drivers' Champion as title-rival Michael Schumacher retired with a punctured tyre on Lap 31.

Schumacher started on pole position but stalled on the formation lap, meaning he was forced to start at the back of the grid. Schumacher managed to climb the field during the course of the race and eventually retired from a punctured tyre sustained from running over debris from an incident that occurred previously.

This was the last race for the Tyrrell racing team, as the team was rebranded into British American Racing the next season.

Report

Background

Heading into the final race of the season, McLaren driver Mika Häkkinen was leading the Drivers' Championship with 90 points; Ferrari driver Michael Schumacher was second with 86 points. A maximum of 10 points were available for the remaining race, which meant that Schumacher could still win the title. Häkkinen only needed a second-place finish to become Drivers' Champion even if Schumacher won—both drivers would be tied on points and number of victories but Häkkinen would claim the title as he would have finished second place three times, compared to Schumacher's two. Behind Häkkinen and Schumacher in the Drivers' Championship, David Coulthard was third on 52 points in a McLaren, with Eddie Irvine fourth on 41 points in a Ferrari.

In the Constructors' Championship, McLaren were leading on 142 points and Ferrari were second on 127 points, with a maximum of 16 points available, meaning Ferrari needed a 1-2 finish with both McLaren finishing outside point-scoring positions to claim the championship (if the two teams were level on points, McLaren would have won on countback due to having more wins than Ferrari).

Ferrari concentrated their testing at their private race track at Mugello, while McLaren tested at the Circuit de Catalunya where they were joined by Benetton and Prost, Arrows, Stewart, new entrants for 1999 BAR and Jordan opted to run at Silverstone.

Because of two controversial incidents that decided the 1994 and 1997 World Championships, Schumacher was placed under strict orders from Ferrari president Luca di Montezemolo not to repeat such incidents.

Competing manufacturer Bridgestone became the sport's single tyre supplier for the  season.

Practice and qualifying

Two practice sessions were held before the race; the first was held on Friday that was split into two parts and the second on Saturday morning. The first session was held for a total of three hours with the second session lasting two hours. Schumacher set the fastest time in the first practice session with a time of 1:39.823, two-tenths of a second from Jordan driver and brother Ralf Schumacher and Williams driver Heinz-Harald Frentzen. Schumacher's team-mate Irvine was fourth fastest, Häkkinen was fifth fastest with team-mate Coulthard rounding out the top six.

The Qualifying session was run as a one-hour session held on Saturday afternoon. Schumacher clinched his third consecutive pole position in his Ferrari, with a time of 1:36.293. He was joined on the front row by Häkkinen, who was one-tenth of a second behind, after not being able to finish his last flying lap by running off in the gravel at the Degner corner. Coulthard was third in the other McLaren. Irvine took fourth in the second Ferrari, with Frentzen taking fifth despite going off into the gravel late in the session.

Race

The start of the race was aborted with the Prost car of Jarno Trulli stalling from 14th position. Before the second attempt to start the race, Schumacher's Ferrari moved forward from his starting position and stalled as he put his car into gear. This promoted Häkkinen into pole position as Schumacher started from the back of the grid.

At the start, Häkkinen pulled away while Irvine overtook Coulthard for second. The Ferrari driver was unable to attack the leading Finn, while Schumacher moved up the order, reaching twelfth place at the end of the first lap. The first retirement was Pedro Diniz who spun out on lap 3 in the Arrows. By lap four, Schumacher overtook his brother Ralf for seventh, but was then stuck behind the fighting former world champions Damon Hill and Jacques Villeneuve, meanwhile Ralf Schumacher would eventually retire with engine failure by the end of lap 14. He lost thirty seconds in the following laps over race leader Häkkinen, damaging his hopes for victory and the title.

After all frontrunners had pitted, Schumacher emerged in third place, having put in some fast laps. On lap 28, Esteban Tuero missed his braking point going into the final corner, crashing into the Tyrrell of Tora Takagi. When Schumacher passed over the debris, he suffered a slow puncture that blew up his right rear tyre three laps later, causing him to retire. This left Häkkinen to take victory and his first drivers' championship. While Eddie Irvine succeeded at keeping David Coulthard behind him, McLaren were nevertheless able to retain their lead over Ferrari in the constructors' championship.

Post-race
After the race, Häkkinen described the situation after the two aborted starts as relieving, saying: "When Michael was forced to start from the back of the grid it raised an enormous amount of pressure from me. The race was not as difficult as others I've had this season. But a lot of that's down to the team who kept letting me know where Eddie and Michael were." Eddie Irvine was quoted saying: "What happened to Michael at the start didn't change our tactics for the race, it destroyed them. When Michael went to the back I knew it was up to me. I made a fantastic start and got close to Mika at some points but just couldn't manage to get in front."

Classification

Qualifying

Race

Championship standings after the race

Drivers' Championship standings

Constructors' Championship standings

 Note: Only the top five positions are included for both sets of standings.
 Bold text indicates 1998 World Champions.

References

Japanese Grand Prix
Japanese Grand Prix
Grand Prix
Japanese Grand Prix